Johnston's river frog (Amietia johnstoni), or Tshiromo frog, is a species of frog in the family Pyxicephalidae.
It is endemic to Malawi.

Its natural habitats are tropical moist montane forests, high-altitude grassland, and rivers. It is threatened by habitat loss.

References

Amietia
Frogs of Africa
Amphibians of Malawi
Endemic fauna of Malawi
Amphibians described in 1894
Taxa named by Albert Günther
Taxonomy articles created by Polbot